The Economist Group (legally The Economist Newspaper Limited) is a media company headquartered in London, England. It is best known as publisher of The Economist newspaper and its sister lifestyle magazine, 1843. The Economist Group specialises in international business and world affairs information. Its principal activities are in print and digital media as well as in conferences and market intelligence.

Ownership
After the death of its founder James Wilson in 1860, The Economist was held in testamentary trust for his six daughters and their dependents. The eldest, Mrs Bagehot, whose husband Walter was editor at the time of Wilson's death, maintained a close personal interest in the paper until her death in 1921. Subsequently, the Wilson trustees were concerned whether surviving beneficiaries would keep touch with the paper's direction, as further deaths formed subsidiary trusts over time. So in 1928 the Wilson Trust decided to sell the paper, whilst creating a structure intended to maintain its reputation for 'independent judgment and unfettered criticism'. A non-controlling 50% went to the Financial Times, and the other half to an influential group of individual shareholders. A new board of independent trustees was created, with rights both to veto the transfer of voting shares and to choose or remove editors-in-chief, who in turn would have sole responsibility for the paper's policy.

Ownership of the 50% shareholding passed to Pearson plc when they bought The Financial Times Limited (FT) in 1957. Later, however, when Pearson plc was negotiating the sale of FT, the Economist's independent trustees veto 'complicated attempts at a deal'. Finally, in August 2015, as part of their sale of the FT to Nikkei, Inc., Pearson sold their share in the Economist.

The Agnelli family's Exor paid £287 million to raise their stake from 4.7% to 43.4%, while the Economist paid £182 million for the balance of 5.04 million shares which will be distributed to current shareholders. Aside from the Agnelli family, smaller shareholders in the company include Cadbury, Rothschild (21%), Schroder, Layton and other family interests as well as a number of staff and former staff shareholders.

History
The origins of The Economist Group date back to the foundation of The Economist: A Political, Commercial, Agricultural, & Free-Trade Journal by James Wilson in 1843.

In 1946, the Economist Intelligence Unit began providing business intelligence to both The Economist newspaper and external clients. In the same year, the Economist bookshop was established as a 50:50 joint venture with the London School of Economics.

Economist Conferences was established as a division of Economist Intelligence Unit in 1956 to offer government roundtables.

In 1995, The Economist Group acquired the Journal of Commerce, a US-based provider of information for the shipping and transportation industries. In the same year the Group launched European Voice, the first pan-European Union weekly newspaper.

In July 2004, The Economist Group launched an upmarket lifestyle magazine called Intelligent Life, an annual publication. This magazine was redesigned as a quarterly in September 2007, and became a bi-monthly publication in August 2011. In March 2016, the magazine was renamed 1843.

Launched in 2010, the Ideas People Channel is a vertical online advertising network of around 50 sites defined by the mindset of the audience. The sites recruited for the network were identified by the readers of The Economist as their favourite online destinations for topics on business, globalisation, innovation and culture. The channel competes in the lower-cost, high-volume network advertising market, a category not previously served by The Economist online. Also recently launched is Economist Education, providing e-learning courses.

In March 2012, The Economist Group acquired the London-based marketing communications agency TVC Group for an undisclosed sum.

In April 2012, the Economist Intelligence Unit expanded in Asia with the acquisition of Clearstate, a market intelligence firm specialising in customised strategic advisory and primary research in the healthcare and life sciences domains.

In July 2015, Canback & Company, a strategy consulting firm operating in more than 70 countries was acquired. It is now known as EIU Canback.

Operations
The Economist Group is headquartered in Canary Wharf, London, England, and has offices worldwide, including in Brussels, Belgium, Frankfurt, Germany, Geneva, Switzerland, Paris, France, Dubai, United Arab Emirates, Johannesburg, South Africa, Hong Kong, mainland China, Singapore, Tokyo, Japan, India, New York City and Washington, D.C. in the United States.

The Economist Group's principal activities are newspapers, magazines, conferences and market intelligence. Publications and services delivered under The Economist brand include The Economist newspaper, The Economist online, Economist Intelligence Unit, Economist Conferences, Economist Corporate Network, The World In series and a bi-monthly lifestyle magazine, 1843. The Group's other brands include CQ Roll Call (aimed at decision-makers on Capitol Hill), EuroFinance, a cash and treasury management event business, and a digital media agency, TVC. European Voice (Brussels), formerly a sister publication of CQ Roll Call, was sold to the French company Selectcom in 2013.

Economist Intelligence Corporate Network
The Economist Intelligence Corporate Network is a members-only service within The Economist Group providing global and regional business intelligence briefings, presentations and advice to its subscribers. The Corporate Network relies on the "information, insight, and interaction" provided by regional experts in its parent organization. 81% of its customers are business executives at the director or senior management levels. It has offices in Dubai, Johannesburg, Beijing, Hong Kong, Shanghai, Singapore and Tokyo.

Corporate affairs

Governance
The current members of the board of directors of The Economist Group are: Rupert Pennant-Rea (Chairman), Zanny Minton Beddoes (editor-in-chief of The Economist), Lady Suzanne Heywood, Brent Hoberman,  David Bell, John Elkann, Alex Karp, Sir Simon Robertson, Lady Lynn Forester de Rothschild, Chris Stibbs and Baroness Jowell.

Former board members include: Andrew Rashbass, Rona Fairhead, Philip Mengel and Eric Schmidt (of Alphabet, parent company of Google).  The current trustees of the Group are: Virginia Bottomley, Gus O'Donnell, Tim Clark and Bryan Sanderson.

Financial data

Source:

References

External links
 
 

 
Economist Group
Financial data vendors
Mass media companies established in 1843
1843 establishments in the United Kingdom
Multinational publishing companies